Auga Punta (possibly from Quechua awqa enemy, opponent, rival; Spanish punta peak) is an archaeological site in Peru located in the Huánuco Region, Huamalíes Province, Jircan District. It is situated at an elevation of ca.  on a mountain named Jircán, near the village of Urpish.

See also 
 Miyu Pampa
 Urpish

References 

Archaeological sites in Peru
Archaeological sites in Huánuco Region